United Nations Security Council resolution 129, adopted unanimously on August 7, 1958, called an emergency special session of the  General Assembly. The resolution states that this was as a result of the lack of unanimity of its permanent members at the council's 834th and 837th meetings which prevented it from exercising its primary responsibility for the maintenance of international peace and security.

See also
List of United Nations Security Council Resolutions 101 to 200 (1953–1965)

References
Text of the Resolution at undocs.org

External links
 

 0129
 0129
 0129
1958 in Lebanon
1958 in Jordan
August 1958 events